Blackburn Rovers were established in 1875, becoming a founding member of The Football League in 1888 and the Premier League in 1992. In 1890, Rovers moved to Ewood Park. They have been English champions three times, and have won six FA Cups, one Football League Cup and one Full Members' Cup. The club has spent most of its existence in the top flight of English football.

The table below details the club's achievements in all national competitions, from their first FA Cup campaign in 1879–80 up until the most recent completed season.

Seasons

Overall
 Seasons spent in First Division / Premier League (1st tier): 71
 Seasons spent in Second Division / Championship (2nd tier): 42
 Seasons spent in Third Division / League One (3rd tier): 6
 Seasons spent in Fourth Division / League Two (4th tier): 0

Correct up to end of 2020–21 season.

Notes

References

External links

Seasons
 
Blackburn Rovers
Blackburn Rovers F.C. Seasons